University of Jeddah or Jeddah University is a public university located in Jeddah, Makkah, Saudi Arabia. The University of Jeddah was established in 2014 and recognized by the Ministry of Education Saudi Arabia.

The university's main campus is located in the Al-Nuzhah district of Jeddah, with additional campuses in Al-Khomrah and Al-Rawdah. 

The university offers undergraduate and graduate programs in various disciplines, including engineering, business, law, medicine, pharmacy, education, and social sciences.

Constituent colleges

 College of the Holy Quran and Islamic Studies
 College of Business
 College of Applied Medical Sciences
 College of Education
 College of Science
 College of Engineering
 College of Medicine
 College of Computer Science and Engineering
 English Language Institute
 College of Art and Design
 College of Social Sciences
 College of Law and Judicial Studies
 College of Sport Sciences
 College of Communication and Media
 College of Languages and Translation
 Community College
College of Business - Alkamil
College of Computer Science - Alkamil
College of Science and Arts - Alkamil
College of Business - Khulais
College of Computer Science - Khulais
College of Science and Arts - Khulais

References

External links 

 Saudi Ministry for education home

Universities and colleges in Saudi Arabia
Educational institutions established in 2014
2014 establishments in Saudi Arabia
Public universities and colleges in Saudi Arabia